Damara longbill may refer to:
 
 Certhilauda benguelensis kaokoensis, a subspecies of the Benguela long-billed lark 
 Karoo long-billed lark, a species of lark